The pascal (symbol: Pa) is the unit of pressure in the International System of Units (SI), and is also used to quantify internal pressure, stress, Young's modulus, and ultimate tensile strength. The unit, named after Blaise Pascal, is defined as one newton per square metre and is equivalent to 10 barye (Ba) in the CGS system. The unit of measurement called standard atmosphere (atm) is defined as 101,325 Pa.

Common multiple units of the pascal are the hectopascal (1 hPa = 100 Pa), which is equal to one millibar, and the kilopascal (1 kPa = 1000 Pa), which is equal to one centibar.

Meteorological observations typically report atmospheric pressure in hectopascals per the recommendation of the World Meteorological Organization, thus a standard atmosphere (atm) or typical sea-level air pressure is about 1013 hPa. Reports in the United States typically use inches of mercury or millibars (hectopascals). In Canada these reports are given in kilopascals.

Etymology 
The unit is named after Blaise Pascal, noted for his contributions to hydrodynamics and hydrostatics, and experiments with a barometer. The name pascal was adopted for the SI unit newton per square metre (N/m2) by the 14th General Conference on Weights and Measures in 1971.

Definition 
The pascal can be expressed using SI derived units, or alternatively solely SI base units, as:

where N is the newton, m is the metre, kg is the kilogram, s is the second, and J is the joule.

One pascal is the pressure exerted by a force of magnitude one newton perpendicularly upon an area of one square metre.

Standard units 
This value is often used as a reference pressure and specified as such in some national and international standards, such as the International Organization for Standardization's ISO 2787 (pneumatic tools and compressors), ISO 2533 (aerospace) and ISO 5024 (petroleum). In contrast, International Union of Pure and Applied Chemistry (IUPAC) recommends the use of 100 kPa as a standard pressure when reporting the properties of substances.

Uses 
The pascal (Pa) or kilopascal (kPa) as a unit of pressure measurement is widely used throughout the world and has largely replaced the pounds per square inch (psi) unit, except in some countries that still use the imperial measurement system or the US customary system, including the United States.

Geophysicists use the gigapascal (GPa) in measuring or calculating tectonic stresses and pressures within the Earth.

Medical elastography measures tissue stiffness non-invasively with ultrasound or magnetic resonance imaging, and often displays the Young's modulus or shear modulus of tissue in kilopascals.

In materials science and engineering, the pascal measures the stiffness, tensile strength and compressive strength of materials. In engineering the megapascal (MPa) is the preferred unit for these uses, because the pascal represents a very small quantity.

The pascal is also equivalent to the SI unit of energy density, the joule per cubic metre. This applies not only to the thermodynamics of pressurised gases, but also to the energy density of electric, magnetic, and gravitational fields.

The pascal is used to measure sound pressure. Loudness is the subjective experience of sound pressure and is measured as a sound pressure level (SPL) on a logarithmic scale of the sound pressure relative to some reference pressure. For sound in air, a pressure of 20 μPa is considered to be at the threshold of hearing for humans and is a common reference pressure, so that its SPL is zero.

The airtightness of buildings is measured at 50 Pa.

In medicine, blood pressure is measured in millimeters of mercury (mmHg, very close to one Torr).  The normal adult blood pressure is less than 120 mmHg systolic BP (SBP) and less than 80 mmHg diastolic BP (DBP). Convert mmHg to SI units as follows: 1 mmHg = 0.13332 kPa. Hence normal blood pressure in SI units is less than 16.0 kPa SBP and less than 10.7 kPa DBP. These values are similar to the pressure of water column of average human height; so pressure has to be measured on arm roughly at the level of the heart.

Hectopascal and millibar units

The units of atmospheric pressure commonly used in meteorology were formerly the bar, which was close to the average air pressure on Earth, and the millibar. Since the introduction of SI units, meteorologists generally measure pressures in hectopascals (hPa) unit, equal to 100 pascals or 1 millibar. Exceptions include Canada, which uses kilopascals (kPa). In many other fields of science, prefixes that are a power of 1000 are preferred, which excludes the hectopascal from use.

Many countries also use millibars. In practically all other fields, the kilopascal (1000 pascals) is used instead.

Multiples and submultiples 
Decimal multiples and sub-multiples are formed using standard SI units.

See also 
 Atmospheric pressure which gives the usage of the hbar and the mbar
 Centimetre of water
 Meteorology
 Metric prefix
 Orders of magnitude (pressure)
 Pascal's law
 Pressure measurement

References

External links

SI derived units
Units of pressure
Blaise Pascal